Filipino boy band SB19 has released one studio album, eight singles, two promotional singles, and thirteen music videos. In 2018, SB19 debuted with the ballad single "Tilaluha" which was met with lukewarm reception. They release "Go Up" in 2019, which became viral on social media gaining them a significant increase in following. They released their first promotional single "Wag Mong Ikunot Ang Iyong Noo" afterwards. After signing with Sony Music Philippines in the same year, SB19 released their third single "Alab (Burning)" in December. In 2020, they released "Ikako" as their second promotional single dedicated to front liners and the country's workforce who battle against the COVID-19 pandemic. "Hanggang sa Huli" was sent to digital streaming platforms in July 2020 as the title track from their debut studio album Get in the Zone. The single "What?" was released on March 9, 2021. "Mapa" was released on May 16, 2021, as a tribute for mothers and fathers. A band version of "Mapa" was released on June 27, 2021, featuring Ben&Ben. On July 22, they released their first extended play Pagsibol with the single "Bazinga". On September 2, they released their single "WYAT".

Studio albums

Extended plays

Singles

As lead artist

As featured artist

Promotional singles

Soundtrack appearances

Notes

References 

Discography
Discographies of Filipino artists
Pop music group discographies
Pop music discographies
Rhythm and blues discographies